"Finding My Road" is the ninth single by melody. under the Toy's Factory label released February 14, 2007. The Japanese single stayed on the Oricon for 4 weeks and peaked at number 14. To date, the single has sold 17,594 copies.

Track listing 
 Finding My Road
 Fragile
 My Dear
 Finding My Road: SiZK "Water Drop" MiX

2006 songs
2007 singles
Melody (Japanese singer) songs
Toy's Factory singles